Halim Medaci (born April 20, 1983 in Nanterre) is a footballer. He is currently without a club, after last playing as a defender for UJA Alfortville. Born in France, he chose to represent Algeria at international level

International career
Medaci received his first call-up to the Algerian National Team for a friendly match against Burkina Faso on November 15, 2006, where he was an unused substitute. He was called up again for a 2008 African Cup of Nations qualifier against Cape Verde, but here too remained an unused sub.

References

1983 births
AS Cannes players
Algerian footballers
French footballers
French sportspeople of Algerian descent
Le Havre AC players
Living people
Ligue 2 players
UJA Maccabi Paris Métropole players
Association football forwards
People from Nanterre
Footballers from Hauts-de-Seine